Cymbiapophysa is a genus of spiders in the family Theraphosidae, first described by Pocock, in 1903, as of 2022 it contains 4 species. The tarantulas of this genus inhabit Central America. Males of this genus can be distinguished by the presence of a distal retrolateral apophysis on the cymbium of the male pedipalp. And females can be distinguished with twin spermathecae, by the morphology and the short and squat receptacles.

Distribution 
This tarantula is found throughout Central America, in Ecuador, Colombia and Peru, this tarantulas are found near the shores facing the Pacific Ocean. Their habitat is partly in the Choco Darien Moist Forest and partially the Western Ecuador Moist Forests.

Species 
 Cymbiapophysa velox Pocock, 1903 - Ecuador 
 Cymbiapophysa yimana Gabriel & Sherwood, 2020 - Peru and Ecuador 
 Cymbiapophysa marimbai Perafán & Valencia-Cuéllar, 2018 - Colombia
 Cymbiapophysa magna Sherwood, Gabriel, Brescovit & Lucas, 2021 - Colombia

References 

Theraphosidae
Spiders described in 1903
Theraphosidae genera